Ocypus nitens is a species of large rove beetle in the family Staphylinidae.

Subspecies
These two subspecies belong to the species Ocypus nitens:
 Ocypus nitens grigiensis (Reitter, 1918) g
 Ocypus nitens ochropus (J.Muller, 1950) g
Data sources: i = ITIS, c = Catalogue of Life, g = GBIF, b = Bugguide.net

References

Further reading

External links

 

Staphylininae
Beetles described in 1781